Glebe House is a historic house located at New Castle, New Castle County, Delaware. It was built between 1821 and 1823 as the glebe house of the rector of Immanuel Church. The house consists of three sections, all brick: a -story plus attic, three bay section; a lower middle section of three bays with a shed roof; and a north section comprising the original kitchen.

It was added to the National Register of Historic Places in 1973.

References

External links

Historic American Buildings Survey in Delaware
Houses on the National Register of Historic Places in Delaware
Houses completed in 1823
Houses in New Castle, Delaware
National Register of Historic Places in New Castle County, Delaware